Fred Kitchen may refer to:
 Fred Kitchen (writer)
 Fred Kitchen (entertainer)